Luther Burbank Performing Arts Center Blues is Lewis Black's fourth album. It was nominated for a Grammy for Best Comedy Album in 2006. It was recorded at the Luther Burbank Center for the Arts in Santa Rosa, California (which has since been renamed the Wells Fargo Center for the Arts). In 2016, it was renamed back to the Luther Burbank Center for the Arts. A limited vinyl edition of 500 for this release was issued by Stand Up! Records. The cover art was modified to look like a road case which contains a microphone.

Track listing
"Superbowl Redux" – 3:50
"MTV" – 3:44
"Halftime '04" – 3:04
"What Sex...........Are They?" – 2:17
"Gay Marriage" – 6:25
"Justin and Janet" – 3:59
"America Loses Its Mind" – 4:29
"Nipple Clamps" – 2:46
"One Nation Under God" – 3:52
"Michael Jackson, Arnold Schwarzenegger, and Ronald Reagan" – 4:05
"Voting (a Flashback)" – 3:32
"Iraq, an Idiot's Delight" – 16:23

References

2005 albums
Lewis Black albums
Comedy Central Records live albums
Stand-up comedy albums
Spoken word albums by American artists
2000s comedy albums